Danzhou is a prefecture-level city in the northwest of the Chinese island province of Hainan. Although called a "city", Danzhou administers a large area which was called Dan County or Danxian until 1993. The administrative seat and urban center of Danzhou is Nada Town, which is often colloquially referred to as Danzhou city. Danzhou was upgraded from a county-level city into a prefecture-level city in February 2015.

History
What is now Danzhou was firstly named Danzhou during the Song Dynasty in the 12th century and only renamed to Danxian in 1912 after hundreds of years, but later re-obtained its name Danzhou after the Communist takeover in the 1950s.

During World War 2, Danzhou was among the top most devastated counties in Hainan as the Japanese had massacred more than 30,000 people in Danzhou, destroying over than 10,000 houses and 300 Danzhou villages.

Subdivisions 
Danzhou is a prefecture-level city of the Hainan province. An uncommon administrative feature is that it has no county-level division. The city government directly administers over 17 towns, one state-run institute, and four state-run farms plus an economic development zone:

Demographics 
The Han population is 857,342 and the minority population is 75,020.

Language
The Danzhou natives speak the Yue Danzhou dialect, unlike the Min Hainanese language that is spoken throughout most of eastern Hainan.

Transportation
It will be international-class, built to handle the increasing number of tourists visiting the area. The airport is scheduled for completion in 2022.

The Hainan Western Ring High-Speed Railway also provides access.

Climate

See also 

 List of administrative divisions of Hainan
 Danzhou dialect

References 

Cities in Hainan
Prefecture-level divisions of Hainan